Patricia Arab is a Canadian politician, who was elected to the Nova Scotia House of Assembly in the 2013 provincial election. A member of the Nova Scotia Liberal Party, she represents the electoral district of Fairview-Clayton Park.

Early life
Arab was born and raised in Halifax, Nova Scotia. She attended Halifax West High School.

Arab graduated with a Bachelor of Arts from University of Kings College/Dalhousie University, and went on to complete her Bachelor of Education and a Masters of Education in Counselling at Mount Saint Vincent University and Acadia University respectively.

Arab was hired by the South Shore Regional School Board shortly after completing her Masters of Education in Counselling. Arab was a Guidance Counsellor and Teacher at Forest Heights Community School, in Chester Grant, where she had the opportunity to work with Dr. Stan Kutcher, in piloting his Mental Health Curriculum, which has since been released nationally.

During her time at the South Shore Regional School Board, Arab facilitated the implementation of a preventative mental health program called PATHS (promoting alternate thinking strategies), which supported children in identifying, naming, and understanding their feelings as a tool to better handle and overcome moments of crisis in their lives. This program was piloted in three elementary schools just outside of Bridgewater.

Political career
Arab was first elected to the Nova Scotia House of Assembly, representing the riding of Fairview-Clayton Park, in 2013. She has the distinction of being one of the youngest female MLAs ever elected in the province of Nova Scotia. Arab was the Chair of the Community Services Committee, and a member of both the Law Amendments and Veterans Affairs Committees.

In 2014, Arab introduced Bill 44—Victoria Hall Continuation Act— an act supporting one of the oldest charitable organizations in the province of Nova Scotia, which for over 150 years has provided shelter, care and community to elderly women.  This act received Royal Assent on November 20, 2014.

Arab is an active member of the Commonwealth Women Parliamentarians (Canada Region), which works for better representation of women in politics. Created in 2005, the Commonwealth Women Parliamentarians (Canada Region) is composed of women parliamentarians of the provincial and territorial legislatures, as well as the federal parliament. The objectives of the organization are to provide opportunities for strategic discussion and development for future and current parliamentarians, act on gender-related issues in Canada and internationally, and increase female representation in Canadian parliaments.

Arab was asked to represent Canada at the International Conference on Women in Politics, held in Amman, Jordan in May 2016. The conference was the first of its kind to be held in a Middle East North African country and united female Parliamentarians from across the world to engage in discussion about the importance of female decision-makers in today’s global society.

In 2017, Arab was actively involved in supporting the Equal Voice Initiative-Daughters of the Vote, which invites one young women between the ages of 18-23 from every federal riding in Canada to represent their community and communicate their vision for Canada.

Arab was re-elected in the 2017 election.

On June 15, 2017 Patricia Arab was sworn in as the Minister of Internal Services and Minister of Communications Nova Scotia, making her the youngest female cabinet minister in the history of the province.

In May 2018, under her responsibility, 250 confidential documents were kept freely downloadable from a public server containing non-anonymized sensitive personal data of Canadian citizens and downloaded by a 19-year-old.

In July 2019, shortly after being asked to take on the added portfolio of Service Nova Scotia, Arab introduced changes allowing Nova Scotians the option of “X” or no gender on all government issued IDs 

On February 23, 2021 Arab was appointed Minister of Service Nova Scotia and Internal Services in Premier Iain Rankin’s newly formed cabinet.

Arab was re-elected in the 2021 election, however the Rankin Liberals lost government becoming the Official Opposition.

Community involvement 
In 2015, Arab was the Honorary Chairperson for the inaugural Step Up Walk for Your Neighbour, a 3 kilometre walk that aims to raise awareness for those who are most in need in Halifax. In total, the event raised $54,000.

Arab was the Honorary Chairperson for the 11th Annual Lebanese Cedar Festival, an event that brings Lebanese culture to the city of Halifax, featuring authentic music, dance, and food prepared by members of the local community.

Electoral record

|-

|Liberal
|Patricia Arab
|align="right"| 2925
|align="right"| 39.9
|align="right"| -6.73
|-

|New Democratic Party
|Joanne Hussey
|align="right"| 2190
|align="right"| 29.87
|align="right"| -1.27
|-

|Progressive Conservative
|Paul Beasant
|align="right"| 1839
|align="right"| 25.08
|align="right"| +7.17
|-

|-

|}

|-

|Liberal
|Patricia Arab
|align="right"| 3369
|align="right"| 46.63
|align="right"|
|-

|New Democratic Party
|Abad Khan
|align="right"| 2250
|align="right"| 31.14
|align="right"| 
|-

|Progressive Conservative
|Travis Price
|align="right"| 1294
|align="right"| 17.91
|align="right"|
|-

|-

|Independent
|Katie Campbell
|align="right"| 136
|align="right"| 1.88
|align="right"|
|}

References

Year of birth missing (living people)
Living people
Canadian Eastern Catholics
Nova Scotia Liberal Party MLAs
Members of the Executive Council of Nova Scotia
People from Halifax, Nova Scotia
Women government ministers of Canada
Women MLAs in Nova Scotia
21st-century Canadian politicians
21st-century Canadian women politicians
University of King's College alumni
Mount Saint Vincent University alumni
School counselors
Canadian politicians of Lebanese descent